Pahnaji (also Romanized as Pahnājī; also known as Pahn Ḩājī and Pahn Ḩājjī) is a village in Kiakola Rural District, in the Central District of Simorgh County, Mazandaran Province, Iran. At the 2006 census, its population was 188, in 55 families.

References 

Populated places in Simorgh County